Graham Island may refer to:

Graham Island, part of the Charlotte Island group in British Columbia, Canada
Graham Island (Nunavut), arctic island in Nunavut, Canada
Graham Island (Mediterranean Sea), British name for a submerged volcanic island in the Mediterranean Sea
 Graham Island, one of the Wessel Islands off the Northern Territory of Australia

See also
Graham Land